The track and field competition at the 2019 Military World Games was held from 22 to 27 October 2019 at the Wuhan Five Rings Sports Center in Wuhan, China. A total of 45 athletics events were contested, 24 by men and 21 by women. Women did not compete in pole vault, 50 kilometres race walk or the 10,000 metres. Marathon events were staged on the East Lake Greenway. For a second time running, para-athletics events were included in the schedule, with a total of 78 medal events available, 41 for men and 37 for women.

Medal summary

Men

Women

Para Athletics
29 Para Athletics events not counted in medal table.

Medal table

References

External links
Results book (Track & Field) (archived)
Results book (Marathon) (archived)

Track and field
2019
Military World Games
2019 Military World Games